Norma Elizabeth Colpari is an activist in the Workers' Party (Argentina).

In November 2013 she was elected as a provincial deputy in Salta Province for the provincial capital.

References

Living people
People from Salta
Workers' Party (Argentina) politicians
21st-century Argentine women politicians
21st-century Argentine politicians
Year of birth missing (living people)